HMAS K9 (formerly Dutch submarine K IX) was a submarine that served with the Royal Netherlands Navy and the Royal Australian Navy.

Construction
K IX was ordered on 27 June 1917, launched on 23 December 1922 and commissioned into the Royal Netherlands Navy on 21 June 1923.

Operational history

Royal Netherlands Navy
K IX was based in the Netherlands East Indies from 13 May 1924. By the outbreak of the Pacific War in 1941, K IX was out of commission but was returned to active service in March 1942. Following the fall of the Netherlands East Indies K IX escaped to Fremantle, Western Australia, arriving on 13 March 1942.

Transfer to Australia
In May 1942 the Dutch government offered K IX to the Royal Australian Navy for use in anti-submarine warfare training. This offer was accepted and K IX arrived in Sydney for repairs on 12 May. On 1 June K IX was damaged by a torpedo explosion during the attack on Sydney Harbour. K IX was decommissioned from the Royal Netherlands Navy on 25 July 1942 and following extensive repairs was commissioned into the Royal Australian Navy as HMAS K9 on 22 June 1943.

Due to the boat's poor mechanical condition HMAS K9 saw little service with the RAN and spent most of her time in commission under repair. K9 was badly damaged by a battery explosion on 22 January 1944. Due to a lack of spare parts the submarine was decommissioned on 31 March 1944, having spent only 31 days at sea. Following her decommissioning K9 re-entered Dutch service as an oil lighter. K9 was washed ashore near Seal Rocks, New South Wales on 8 June 1945 while under tow to Merauke in Dutch New Guinea and subsequently stripped for scrap.

The remnants of K9 were located on 20 July 1999 by the New South Wales Government's Heritage Office. The beach on which it grounded and its remnants remain is known as Submarine Beach.

Notes

References

External links
 Submarines Association of Australia The Pioneers
 Dutchsubmarines.com The Submarine K IX

K VIII-class submarines
1922 ships
World War II submarines of the Netherlands
Submarines of the Royal Australian Navy
Shipwrecks in the Solomon Sea
World War II shipwrecks in the Pacific Ocean
World War II submarines of Australia
Shipwrecks of the Mid North Coast Region
Submarines built by Koninklijke Maatschappij De Schelde